A black bloc is a tactic used by protesters who wear black clothing, ski masks, scarves, sunglasses, motorcycle helmets with padding or other face-concealing and face-protecting items. The clothing is used to conceal wearers' identities and hinder criminal prosecution by making it difficult to distinguish between participants. It is also used to protect their faces and eyes from pepper spray, which is used by police during protests or civil unrest. The tactic also allows the group to appear as one large unified mass. Black bloc participants are often associated with anarchism, anarcho-communism, communism, libertarian socialism and the anti-globalization movement.

The tactic was developed in the 1980s in the European autonomist movement's protests against squatter evictions, nuclear power, and restrictions on abortion, as well as other influences. Black blocs gained broader media attention outside Europe during the 1999 Seattle WTO protests, when a black bloc damaged property of Gap, Starbucks, Old Navy, and other multinational retail locations in downtown Seattle.

History

Precursors
In February 1967, the anarchist group Black Mask marched on Wall Street in New York City wearing black clothes and balaclavas. This was the first instance of a social movement in the western world utilizing masks and black dress, which were used not for purposes of disguise but to signify a militant identity. In this regard, Black Mask anticipated and may have indirectly influenced the black bloc tactic.

West German origins

This tactic was developed in response to increased use of police force following the 1977 Brokdorf demonstration.

On 1 May 1987, demonstrators in Berlin-Kreuzberg were confronted by West Berlin police. After this, thousands of people attacked the police with rocks, bottles and Molotov cocktails. The riots at the May Day in Kreuzberg became famous after the police had to completely pull out of the "SO 36" neighborhood in Kreuzberg for several hours, and rioters looted shops together with residents.

When Ronald Reagan came to Berlin in June 1987, he was met by around 50,000 demonstrators protesting against his Cold War policies. This included a black bloc of 3,000 people. In November 1987, the residents were joined by thousands of other protesters and fortified their squat, built barricades in the streets and defended themselves against the police for nearly 24 hours. After this the city authorities legalised the squatters residence.

Since the late 1980s, Berlin's Kreuzberg district has hosted May Day clashes between anarchists and police. When the World Bank and the International Monetary Fund met in Berlin in 1988, autonomous groups hosted an international gathering of anti-capitalist activists. Numbering around 80,000, the protesters greatly outnumbered the police. Officials tried to maintain control by banning all demonstrations and attacking public assemblies. Nevertheless, there were riots and upmarket shopping areas were destroyed.

Unified Germany

In the period after the fall of the Berlin Wall, the German black bloc movement continued traditional riots such as May Day in Berlin-Kreuzberg, but with decreasing intensity. Their main focus became the struggle against the recurring popularity of Neo-Nazism in Germany. The "turn" came in June 2007, during the 33rd G8 summit. A black bloc of 2,000 people built barricades, set cars alight and attacked the police during a mass demonstration in Rostock. 400 police officers were injured, as well as about 500 demonstrators and activists. According to the German Verfassungsschutz, the weeks of organisation before the demonstration and the riots themselves amounted to a revival for the militant left in Germany. Since the "Battle of Rostock", traditional "May Day Riots" after demonstrations every 1 May in Berlin, and since 2008 also in Hamburg, became more intense.

International development

North America

The first prominent use of the tactic in United States of America occurred at the Pentagon, in Washington, D.C., on 17 October 1988, although anarchists had been using similar tactics in small numbers in preceding years in places like San Francisco, culminating with several hundred anarchists in black smashing glass store fronts and attacking vehicles in the Berkeley Anarchist Riot of 1989. In D.C., over one thousand demonstrators—a small number consisting of a black bloc—called for the end to U.S. support for the right wing death squads in El Salvador. A black bloc caused damage to property of GAP, Starbucks, Old Navy, and other retail locations in downtown Seattle during the 1999 anti-WTO demonstrations. They were a common feature of subsequent anti-globalization protests.

In the years after the end of the Vietnam War, protest in the US came to assume more legalistic, orderly forms, and was increasingly dominated by the middle-class. This corresponded with the rise of a highly effective police strategy of crowd control called "negotiated management". Many social scientists have noted the "institutionalization of movements" in this period. These currents largely constrained disruptive protest until 1999. In an unprecedented success for post-Vietnam era civil disobedience, the WTO Ministerial Conference opening ceremonies were shut down completely, host city Seattle declared a state of emergency for nearly a week, multilateral trade negotiations between the wealthy and developing nations collapsed, and all of this was done without fatalities. This occurred in the midst of mass rioting which had been set off by militant anarchists, some of them in a black bloc formation.

The call for the Seattle protest had originally come from Peoples' Global Action (a network co-founded by the Zapatistas) which supported diversity of tactics and a highly flexible definition of nonviolence. In the aftermath of the shutdown, however, various NGO spokespeople associated with Seattle DAN claimed that the riotous aspect of the WTO protests was counterproductive and undemocratic. They also asserted that it was only an insignificantly small group from Eugene, Oregon that engaged in property destruction. Medea Benjamin told The New York Times that "These anarchists should have been arrested", while Lori Wallach of Public Citizen stated that she had instructed Teamsters to assault black bloc participants. Barbara Ehrenreich decried the NGO leaders as "hypocrites", and wrote that nonviolent activists ought to be "treating the young rock-throwers like sisters and brothers in the struggle." She also criticized the dominant nonviolent paradigm as "absurdly ritualized". The solution to Ehrenreich's impasse was the growing acceptance of black bloc tactics in the anti-globalization movement.

During protests against the 2010 G20 summit in Toronto, a black bloc riot damaged a number of retail locations including an Urban Outfitters, American Apparel, Adidas Store, Starbucks and many banking establishments.

On the day of President Donald Trump's inauguration, black bloc groups were present among other protests in Washington, D.C., and other places. The groups engaged in vandalism, rioting, and violence. At least 217 were arrested and six police officers sustained minor injuries, and at least one other person was injured.

In February 2017, an event at the University of California, Berkeley by commentator Milo Yiannopoulos was cancelled by college administrators after protestors of a black bloc broke windows, shot fireworks, and caused a light fixture to catch fire. The cancellation of the event brought mainstream attention to anarchism and black bloc tactics.

In May 2021, Portland protesters in black bloc turned out at multiple rallies and marches that marked the one-year anniversary of the murder of George Floyd. At one event the protesters wheeled a dumpster into the street and set its contents on fire, drawing police out. The rally was declared a riot by police.

Brazil
During the June–July 2013 mass public demonstrations, groups of people using Black Bloc tactics started attending demonstrations, especially those held across the street from governor of Rio de Janeiro State Sérgio Cabral's residence and the state government palace. Police face accusations of infiltrating the movement and, at times, acting as agents provocateurs by starting confrontations. Many leftists claim that video footage shows an infiltrated police officer throwing a molotov cocktail that wounded a riot policeman, although this has been denied by the police and hasn't been proven until today (2017). Protester violence occurred regularly during the Brazilian protests (particularly the week of 17 to 21 June) even when not linked with the black bloc, or with police infiltration.

Despite the denunciations by media, police, and even some activists, the black bloc tactic persisted in the movement. By October 2013, "The mask-wearers were welcomed by the protesters who wanted to wreak havoc during manifestations... Indeed, this sense of solidarity amidst the demonstrations, this shared manning of barricades, inspires a common determination to fight against the fear of repression." According to a report by two Brazilian leftists published in Al Jazeera, this coincided with a revival in the breadth of the street protests that had not been seen since its early days in June. On 10 October, the Rio teacher's union (Sepe) officially declared support for the recent black bloc actions, stating that the bloc were "welcome" at their demonstrations. Postings on teacher Facebook groups praised bloc participants as "fearless".

Europe

On 1 May 2018, over 1,200 black bloc took part in demonstrations in Paris, France. Public infrastructures and stores were damaged. During the demonstrations of the Yellow vests movement (autumn 2018-spring 2019) major damage was done by black bloc in Paris, Toulouse and Bordeaux. The protest resulting in the most significant amount of property damage took place in Paris when protestors took to the streets on the Champs-Élysées on 16 March 2019.

A group of about 400 black bloc demonstrators took part in the 2011 London anti-cuts protest where they targeted various high end retail outlets; according to journalist Paul Mason this may have been the largest ever black bloc assembly in the UK. Mason says some of the participants were anarchists from Europe, others were British students who joined the demonstrations after participating in the 2010 UK student protests. A black bloc protested the opening of the universal exposition Expo 2015 in Milan.

Amongst hundreds of thousands of protesters protesting the G20 Summit in Hamburg Germany were thousands of black clad rioters who clashed with police in a 3-day standoff resulting in millions of euros in property damage. At least 500 protestors were injured and more than 200 were arrested.

Egypt
On 25 January 2013, on the second anniversary of the Egyptian Revolution, black blocs made an appearance in the Egyptian political scenes where they reportedly attacked various Muslim Brotherhood headquarters and government buildings and stopped traffic and metro lines in more than eight cities. A group of young protesters, who identified themselves as the "Black Bloc", have marked the second anniversary of the Egyptian revolution by blocking the tramway tracks in Alexandria on Friday. Egyptian Prosecutor General Talaat Abdallah ordered the police and armed forces to arrest any participant in the Black Bloc, pointing out that the group was carrying out "terrorist activities" and was considered by the government and under the new constitution a violent radical outlaw group.

Police infiltration
On occasion, police and security services have infiltrated black blocs, for purposes of investigation. Allegations first surfaced after several demonstrations. At the 2001 G8 summit in Genoa, among the many complaints about the police there was mention of video footage which "suggests that men in black were seen getting out of police vans near protest marches." In August 2007, Quebec police admitted that "their officers disguised themselves as demonstrators" in Montebello. However, the officers purportedly did not engage in violence, and claimed that they were carrying rocks because other protesters were doing so. They were identified by genuine protesters because of their police-issue footwear. According to veteran activist Harsha Walia, it was other participants in the black bloc who identified and exposed the undercover police.

There is no evidence that the black bloc tactic is particularly vulnerable to infiltration, however, as investigatory—and even agent provocateur—activity has taken place regularly among completely nonviolent, non-"black bloc" campaigns. In 2003, the Oakland, California Police Department infiltrated a group of demonstrators protesting police brutality and the war in Iraq at the port; subpoenaed private comments by Captain Howard Jordan indicate that his plan was to steer the march away from the police station in order to avoid confrontation. In internal documents, Jordan mentioned this strategy was common in other police departments, including San Francisco and Seattle.

Tactics

Tactics of a black bloc primarily include vandalism of private property, rioting, and demonstrating without a permit. Tactics can also include use of defensive measures such as misleading the authorities, assisting in the escape of people arrested by the police ("un-arrests" or "de-arrests"), administering first aid to persons affected by tear gas, rubber bullets and other riot control measures in areas where protesters are barred from entering, building barricades, resisting the police, and practicing jail solidarity. Property destruction carried out by black blocs tends to have symbolic significance: common targets include banks, institutional buildings, outlets for multinational corporations, gasoline stations, and video-surveillance cameras.

There may be several blocs within a particular protest, with different aims and tactics. As an ad hoc group, blocs often share no universally common set of principles or beliefs apart from an adherence to—usually—leftist or autonomist values, although some anarchist groups have called for the Saint Paul Principles to be adapted as a framework in which diverse tactics can be deployed. A few radical right-wing groups, like some of the "autonomous nationalists" of Europe or the Australian so-called "National-Anarchists" have adopted "black bloc" tactics and dress. The political scientist Nicholas Apoifis, in his ethnography of anarchism in Athens, Greece, argues that black bloc action can constitute a form of prefigurative politics, due to its "flat and horizontal organisational structure, alongside its focus on solidarity."

See also

 Anti-Nazi League
 Antifa (Germany)
 Antifa (United States)
 Battle of Cable Street
 Green Mountain Anarchist Collective
 Primera Línea
 Rebecca Riots
 Rock Against Racism
 Unite Against Fascism
 Anonymous (hacker group)

References

Further reading

 
 
 
 
 
 
 Gee, Teoman (2001) "Militancy Beyond Black Blocs". Alpine Anarchist Productions.
 
 
 
 Katsiaficas, George. The Subversion of Politics: European Social Movements and the Decolonization of Everyday Life. Oakland and Edinburgh: AK Press, 2006.
 Mohandesi, Salar (2012) "On the Black Bloc." Viewpoint Magazine.
 
 Shantz, Jeff. Active Anarchy: Political Practice in Contemporary Movements. Lanham, MD: Lexington Books, 2011.
 Black Blocs and Contemporary Propaganda of the Deed, by Jeff Shantz
 
 Green Mountain Anarchist Collective (NEFAC-VT) & Columbus Anti-Racist Action; A Communiqué on Tactics and Organization to the Black Bloc, from within the Black Bloc, Black Clover Press, 2001.
 Van Deusen, David; West, Sean; Green Mountain Anarchist Collective; Neither Washington Nor Stowe: Common Sense For The Working Vermonter, Catamount Tavern Press, this pamphlet shows a genesis of focus from organizing Bloc Blocs to organizing towards a libertarian-socialist society in northern New England.
 Van Deusen, David; On Anarchism: Dispatches From The People's Republic of Vermont, foreword by Jeff Jones of the Weather Underground, Algora Publishing, 2017, . 
 Van Deusen, David; Van Deusen On North American Black Blocs 1996-2001, The Anarchist Library, 2017.
 Van Deusen, David; Green Mountain Anarchist Collective; On The Question of Violence and Nonviolence As a Tactic and Strategy Within The Social Protest Movement: An Anarchist Perspective, Black Clover Press, 2001.
 Van Deusen, David; Massot, Xavier; Green Mountain Anarchist Collective; The Black Bloc Papers: An Anthology of Primary Texts From The North American Anarchist Black Bloc 1988–2005, Breaking Glass Press, Shawnee Mission, KS, 2010. 
 Van Deusen, David; The Rise and Fall of The Green Mountain Anarchist Collective, 2015, this article looks at the Green Mountain Anarchist Collective, why they came to take part in Black Blocs, and how they moved beyond the Black Bloc.

External links

 Infoshop: Black Blocs for Dummies
 "Blocs, Black and Otherwise" by CrimethInc.

Anarchist theory
Anarcho-communism
Anarcho-punk
Anonymity
Anti-capitalism
Anti-fascism
Autonomism
Black symbols
Clothing by function
Clothing controversies
Clothing in politics
Collectivist anarchism
DIY culture
Political masks
Protest tactics